John Long Jackson (March 28, 1884 – September 2, 1948) was bishop of the Episcopal Diocese of Louisiana from 1940 to 1948.

Biography
Jackson was born on March 28, 1884, in Baltimore, Maryland, the son of Edward Thornton Jackson and Mary Helen Long. He was educated at the Episcopal High School in Alexandria, Virginia. He later studied at Johns Hopkins University, from where he graduated with a Bachelor of Arts in 1905, and the Virginia Theological Seminary. He was awarded a Doctor of Divinity from Sewanee: The University of the South and the Virginia Seminary, respectively, both in 1908.

On June 14, 1908, he was ordained deacon by Bishop William Paret of Maryland, and on June 11, 1909, he was ordained a priest by Bishop Alfred Harding of Washington. He served as curate at Trinity Church in Towson, Maryland from 1908 till 1909, and curate of St Paul's Church in Baltimore, Maryland, between 1909 and 1910. He became rector of Emmanuel Church in Harrisonburg, Virginia in 1910. In 1914, he became rector of St Martin's Church in Charlotte, North Carolina.

In 1940 he was elected Bishop of Louisiana and was consecrated on May 1. During his time as bishop the number of communicants in the diocese increased by 1680. Moreover, six missions were created and eleven new parishes were established. He later served as director of the Kanuga Adult Conference. Jackson died in office on September 2, 1948.

References 

1884 births
1948 deaths
Bishops in Louisiana
Religious leaders from Baltimore
20th-century American Episcopalians
Episcopal bishops of Louisiana